Married to It is a 1991 film directed by Arthur Hiller starring Beau Bridges, Stockard Channing, Robert Sean Leonard, Mary Stuart Masterson, Cybill Shepherd and Ron Silver. The film is about three New York City couples with disparate careers, ages, and lifestyles who nonetheless bond through their mutual connection to a local private school. As they help to stage a school pageant with a 1960s theme, each couple begins to quarrel and reassess their marriage.

Plot

Married to It is about three couples who meet by chance at a private school fundraiser and come together to organize a school pageant while becoming friends. Claire and Leo LaRonde are two fast-talking yuppies, Leo runs a doll-making company, and Claire is a savvy business woman but not a very good maternal figure to Lucy, Leo's daughter  from a past marriage. Lucy and Claire have a strained relationship. John and Iris Morden are a pair of worn-out hippies with two preteen sons, John works in welfare while Iris is a housewife who takes up some artsy jobs especially with the school here and there. Nina and Charles (Chuck) Bishop are an earnest and hopeful young couple from Iowa, who are worried about making their young marriage last. Chuck is an ambitious stock broker and Nina a school psychologist at the school where Iris's and Leos’ kids attend. Although they face a slightly awkward start, together these three couples face various challenges and learn about their marital problems as well as each other.

Cast
 Beau Bridges as John Morden
 Stockard Channing as Iris Morden
 Robert Sean Leonard as Chuck Bishop
 Mary Stuart Masterson as Nina Bishop
 Cybill Shepherd as Claire Laurent
 Ron Silver as Leo Rothenberg
 Don Francks as Sol Chamberlain
 Donna Vivino as Lucy Rothenberg
 Jimmy Shea as Marty Morden
 Nathaniel Moreau as Kenny Morden
 Diane D'Aquila as Madeleine Rothenberg
 Chris Wiggins as Dave
 Paul Gross as Jeremy Brimfield
 Gerry Bamman as Arthur Everson
 Djanet Sears as Mrs. Foster
 George Sperdakos as Murray
 Larry Reynolds as Mullaney
 Edward I. Koch as Himself
 Louis Di Bianco as Romero
 George Guidall as Lawyer
 John Ottavino as Lawyer
 Jamie De Roy as Newscaster
 Nancy Cser as Blonde at Ballet
 Chris Bickford as Student
 Jason Pechet as Student
 Charles Kerr as Banker
 Susan Henley as Secretary
 Howard Jerome as Burly Mover
 Marilyn Boyle as Older Woman
 Marc Gomes as Ross
 Philip Akin as Limo Driver
 Gregory Jbara as Cafe Waiter
 Michael A. Miranda as Trendy Waiter
 Aaron Ashmore as Student in Pageant
 Shawn Ashmore as Student in Pageant
 Heather Brown as Student in Pageant
 Kelly Campbell as Student in Pageant
 Hugh Eastwood as Student in Pageant
 Tara Strong as Student in Pageant (as Tara Charendoff)
 Former New York City mayor Ed Koch appears as himself in a cameo.

Reception
The film was not well received by critics. Rotten Tomatoes gives the film a score of 30% based on 10 reviews.

Film critic Roger Ebert noted, "At one point it seemed destined to go directly to TV and the video stores."

References

External links 

1991 films
1991 comedy-drama films
Orion Pictures films
Films directed by Arthur Hiller
Films scored by Henry Mancini
American comedy-drama films
Films set in New York City
1990s English-language films
1990s American films